Andriy Kononenko (born 7 March 1974) is a Ukrainian professional football coach and a former player.

References

External links
 
 

1975 births
Living people
Sportspeople from Sumy
Ukrainian footballers
FC Olympik Kharkiv players
FC Shakhtar Konotop players
FC Hirnyk-Sport Horishni Plavni players
Ukrainian football managers
PFC Sumy managers
FC Barsa Sumy managers
FC Inhulets-2 Petrove managers
FC Krystal Kherson managers
Association football forwards